Reno O. Strand (May 14, 1909 – June 27, 1988) was an American professional basketball player. He played for the Cleveland White Horses in the National Basketball League during the 1938–39 season and averaged 2.8 points per game.

References

1909 births
1988 deaths
American men's basketball players
Basketball players from Pennsylvania
Cleveland White Horses players
Forwards (basketball)
Guards (basketball)
High school basketball coaches in the United States
Sportspeople from Erie, Pennsylvania